Company and the Crazy is a 1928 silent Italian film directed by Mario Almirante. The film features an early onscreen performance from Vittorio De Sica.

Cast
 Vasco Creti as Momi Tamberlan
 Carlo Tedeschi as Bortolo Cioci
 Alex Bernard as Piero Scavezza
 Elena Lunda as Irma
 Lili Migliore as Ginetta
 Cellio Bucchi as Conte Bardonazzi
 Vittorio De Sica as Prof. Rosolillo
 Giuseppe Brignone as Sioria
 Felice Minotti
 Giuseppe Migliore
 Andrea Miano
 Amilcare Taglienti

References

External links

1928 films
Italian silent feature films
Italian black-and-white films
Films directed by Mario Almirante